Charles Bush may refer to:

 Charles G. Bush (1842–1909), American cartoonist
 Charles P. Bush (1809–1857), politician from the U.S. state of Michigan
 Charles V. Bush (1939–2012), first African-American page of the Supreme Court of the United States
 Charles W. Bush (1881–1955), mayor of Anchorage, Alaska

See also
 Charles F. Brush (1849–1929), American engineer, inventor, entrepreneur, and philanthropist